Basilica of the Uganda Martyrs can refer to:
 Basilica of the Uganda Martyrs, Namugongo, in Wakiso District
 Munyonyo Martyrs' Shrine, a minor basilica in the Kampala area